Stephen Robert Dunlop (25 November 1960 – 15 May 2008) was a Northern Irish motorcycle racer, the younger brother of fellow road racer, the late Joey Dunlop, and the father of William Dunlop and Michael Dunlop. Like Joey, Robert died after a crash. His son William died in a crash during practice at the Skerries 100 in Dublin on 7 July 2018.

Biography
After an apprenticeship on short circuits, the teenage Dunlop made his road race debut at the 1979 Temple 100. His first appearance at the Cookstown 100 came in 1980, riding a 347 cm3 Yamaha. His first professional race, where he was fully sponsored was at Aghadowey in 1981.

Dunlop then began a record breaking run at the Cookstown 100, where his first win came in the 1985 250 cm3 race. Riding an ECM, he averaged 88.57 mph to take the chequered flag ahead of Gary Cowan (EMC) and Noel Hudson (Rotax). His most successful year was 1987 when he scooped the prestigious "Man of the Meeting", winning 125 cm3, 350 cm3 and 1000 cm3 races. Four more 125 cm3 victories followed in 1988, 1989, 1991 and 1993; a total of eight victories in the event.

He won the Macau Grand Prix in 1989 on a Honda 500, beating Phillip McCallen and Steve Hislop, both on Honda 750's.

In 1990 he joined the JPS Norton racing team on the RCW588, which was powered by a Wankel engine. On short circuits Dunlop notched one of the three MCN Supercup wins, the other two by Terry Rymer. Dunlop notched a double in Ireland's North West 200 and finished third in the F1 Isle of Man TT.

In 1994, Dunlop suffered a major accident on the Isle of Man Formula One TT, when the back wheel of his 750 cm3 Honda RC45 collapsed in a long left turn, just after he took the jump over Ballaugh Bridge. Dunlop suffered multiple injuries and was lucky to have survived the high-speed crash. A long stay in hospital, followed by protracted recuperation, meant Dunlop was out of action for the remainder of 1994 and all of 1995.

Many believed that Dunlop's racing career was over, and he was left with severe tendon damage which restricted movement, and a shortened leg from the accident. Afterwards accepting his injuries and resultantly restricting his competition entries from then on to the 125 cm3 class, Dunlop was determined to return. Dunlop chose the Cookstown 100 on 20 April 1996, and although still not fully fit, took ninth place in the 125 cm3 race won by brother Joey. He was never to win the main Cookstown 100 race again, but returned every year in the 125 cm3 class: 3rd in 1997, 4th in 1998, 3rd in 2002 and 2nd in 2004.

Subject to severe insurance restrictions and costs due to his continual pain and deteriorating condition of his leg, and even questions in the Northern Ireland Assembly, on 16 December 2003 Dunlop announced that he would quit motorcycle racing after the 2004 season. Dunlop announced that he was hoping to win the Isle of Man TT and North West 200 before he quit, and that he intended to focus on his sons, William and Michael, and pass his motorcycling experience to them. Robert continued racing until his retirement at the 2004 Isle of Man TT races.

On 8 February 2005 he was the first person to be elected to the "Irish Motorcycle Hall of Fame". At the event, Dunlop announced that he was shortly to enter hospital to have his injured leg broken and lengthened, an inevitable conclusion to his 1994 Isle of Man TT accident. He also announced if all went well, he would love to return to motorcycle racing in 2006, sponsored by Patsy O'Kane in a last hurrah. Dunlop actually came back out of retirement during the 2005 road racing season.

Dunlop took his record-breaking 15th win at the 2006 North West 200 meeting. The Dunlop brothers between them also won a record number of races at the North West 200.

Isle of Man TT record

A winner on the course at his first attempt, Dunlop won the 1983 Newcomers 350 cm3 Manx Grand Prix. In 1992 he finished 2nd in the 125 and 3rd in the Junior and Senior and in 1993 he finished 2nd in the 125.

In 1994 an accident at Ballaugh Bridge in the Formula 1 ended his week. He did not race again in the TT until 1997 in the 125 cm3 Race and took third place. In 1998 he won the Ultra-Lightweight race and in 1999 finished 5th. In 2000 he rode a Honda in the Ultra-Lightweight and brought it home in third place. Over his career, he finished on a TT podium 14 times.

Complete TT record

Awards

On 8 February 2005 he was the first person to be elected to the "Irish Racer Magazine Hall of Fame".

In February 2006, it was announced that Dunlop and his brother Joey were honoured with Honorary Degrees from the University of Ulster, in light of their achievements in the field of motorcycle racing. On 4 July the pair were awarded honorary Doctorate of the University (DUniv) from the University of Ulster in Coleraine.

Personal life
The son of Willie and May Dunlop, he was mentored by close friend Liam Beckett. Married to Louise, the couple had three sons, William, Michael and Daniel. William and Michael both became motorcycle racers.

Death
On 15 May 2008 Dunlop died after suffering severe chest injuries in a crash during a practice session at the North West 200. The fatal accident happened in the 250 cc qualifying as the riders approached the Mather's Cross section of the course. When the engine on his motorcycle seized he mistakenly hit the motorcycle's front brake, which was situated beside the clutch on his specially modified bike, and he was thrown over the handlebars at approximately 155 mph (250 km/h). As he crashed, a following rider, Darren Burns, collided with him and suffered a broken leg and concussion in the accident. Dunlop was taken to Causeway Hospital in Coleraine before succumbing to his injuries shortly after 22:00 local time. Dunlop had been racing in the 250 cc class that year for the first time since the 1994 Isle of Man TT. His son Michael went on to win the race and dedicated the victory to his father.

His funeral took place on 18 May 2008 at Garryduff Presbyterian Church in his home town of Ballymoney. Dunlop was laid to rest beside his brother, Joey.

See also
Road (2014 film)

References

External links

 Robert Dunlop on Isle of Man Guide
 Memorial site for Robert Dunlop
 North West 200 Official Website
 Obituary: Independent

People associated with Ulster University
British motorcycle racers
Motorcycle racers from Northern Ireland
Isle of Man TT riders
Superbike World Championship riders
Motorcycle racers who died while racing
1960 births
2008 deaths
Sport deaths in Northern Ireland
People from Ballymoney
Robert